Green Township is one of the ten townships of Fayette County, Ohio, United States. As of the 2010 census the population was 532.

Geography
Located in the southwestern corner of the county, it borders the following townships:
Concord Township - north
Perry Township - east
Madison Township, Highland County - southeast
Fairfield Township, Highland County - south
Wayne Township, Clinton County - west

No municipalities are located in Green Township.

Name and history
It is one of sixteen Green Townships statewide.

Government
The township is governed by a three-member board of trustees, who are elected in November of odd-numbered years to a four-year term beginning on the following January 1. Two are elected in the year after the presidential election and one is elected in the year before it. There is also an elected township fiscal officer, who serves a four-year term beginning on April 1 of the year after the election, which is held in November of the year before the presidential election. Vacancies in the fiscal officership or on the board of trustees are filled by the remaining trustees.

References

External links
County website

Townships in Fayette County, Ohio
Townships in Ohio